Zakharovskaya is a rural locality (a village) in Dvinitskoye Rural Settlement, Syamzhensky District, Vologda Oblast, Russia. The population was 17 as of 2002.

Geography 
Zakharovskaya is located 59 km northeast of Syamzha (the district's administrative centre) by road. Averinskaya is the nearest rural locality.

References 

Rural localities in Syamzhensky District